Team Idea 2010 ASD was a UCI Continental team founded in 2010 and based in Italy. It participated in UCI Continental Circuits races. The team disbanded at the end of the 2015 season.

Doping
In July 2015 Francesco Reda, tested positive for EPO in an anti-doping control that was taken at the Italian Road Championships held on June 27. In February 2016, Reda was banned for eight years.

Team roster

Major wins

2012
Stage 1 Settimana Internazionale di Coppi e Bartali, Andrea Palini
Giro del Medio Brenta, Matteo Busato
2014
GP Izola, Christian Delle Stelle
Trofeo Franco Balestra, Christian Delle Stelle
Stage 8 Rás Tailteann, Davide Ballerini
Stage 2 Giro della Regione Friuli, Ricardo Pichetta
2015
Trofeo Edil C, Francesco Reda
Stage 1 Rás Tailteann, Francesco Reda
Stage 3 Rás Tailteann, Matteo Malucelli
Overall Okolo Slovenska, Davide Viganò
Stage 3, Davide Viganò
Stage 3 Volta a Portugal, Davide Viganò
Stage 10 Volta a Portugal, Matteo Malucelli

References

UCI Continental Teams (Europe)
Cycling teams based in Italy
Cycling teams established in 2012
Cycling teams disestablished in 2015